Chebyshev's theorem is any of several theorems proven by Russian mathematician Pafnuty Chebyshev. 

 Bertrand's postulate, that for every n there is a prime between n and 2n.
 Chebyshev's inequality, on range of standard deviations around the mean, in statistics
 Chebyshev's sum inequality, about sums and products of decreasing sequences
 Chebyshev's equioscillation theorem, on the approximation of continuous functions with polynomials
 The statement that if the function  has a limit at infinity, then the limit is 1 (where  is the prime-counting function). This result has been superseded by the prime number theorem.